Pieter de Villiers is a Namibian politician. A member of the Congress of Democrats (CoD), de Villiers was a town councillor of Opuwo, capital of the Kunene Region.

References

Year of birth missing (living people)
Living people
Coloured Namibian people
Namibian people of South African descent
Congress of Democrats politicians
People from Kunene Region
Place of birth missing (living people)